The 2011–12 DFB-Pokal was the 69th season of the annual German football cup competition. It commenced on 29 July 2011 with the first of six rounds and concluded on 12 May 2012 with the final at the Olympiastadion in Berlin.

Since both finalists have qualified for the UEFA Champions League, the 2012–13 UEFA Europa League (group stage) spot was given to the fifth-placed Bundesliga team. Schalke 04 were the reigning holders, but they were beaten by Borussia Mönchengladbach in the round of 16.

Participating clubs
The following 64 teams competed in the first round:

Schedule
The rounds of the 2011–12 competition are scheduled as follows:

Draw
The draws for the different rounds are conducted as following: For the first round, the participating teams will be split into two pots. The first pot contains all teams which have qualified through their regional cup competitions, the best four teams of the 3rd Liga and the bottom four teams of the Second Bundesliga. Every team from this pot will be drawn to a team from the second pot, which contains all remaining professional teams. The teams from the first pot will be set as the home team in the process.

The two-pot scenario will also be applied for the second round, with the remaining 3rd Liga/amateur teams in the first pot and the remaining professional teams in the other pot. Once one pot is empty, the remaining pairings will be drawn from the other pot with the first-drawn team for a match serving as hosts. For the remaining rounds, the draw will be conducted from just one pot. Any remaining 3rd Liga/amateur team will be the home team if drawn against a professional team. In every other case, the first-drawn team will serve as hosts.

Matches

First round
The draw was made on 11 June 2011.

As in the 2010–11 competition, Hallescher FC will have to move their first-round match against Eintracht Frankfurt to another ground because re-building of their own Kurt-Wabbel-Stadion has not yet been completed. After several attempts of moving the tie to other locations, including Paul-Greifzu-Stadion at nearby Dessau-Roßlau and Frankenstadion at Nuremberg, were unsuccessful because of security concerns, the match will eventually be played at cross-town Stadion am Bildungszentrum, the current home ground of the club. Anker Wismar will also have to move their tie against Hannover 96 from their own Paul-Bürger-Stadion because of security requirements. The match will be played at Lohmühle, Lübeck. Other matches have been moved for capacity reasons, including FC Teningen–FC Schalke 04 (to be played at Badenova-Stadion in nearby Freiburg), SC Wiedenbrück 2000–1. FC Köln (to be played at Heidewaldstadion, Gütersloh), SVN Zweibrücken–1. FSV Mainz 05 (to be played at Waldstadion, Homburg) and Germania Windeck–1899 Hoffenheim (Sportpark Höhenberg, Cologne). Headlines made Hamburg Cup winner Eimsbütteler TV, who lost almost its complete first and second teams because of disagreements over how to split the money earned from reaching the first round. ETV was forced to field a side predominantly made up of players from its under-19 side.

All times CEST

Second round
The draw for this round took place on 6 August 2011. The matches were played on 25–26 October 2011.

Round of 16
The draw for this round took place on 30 October 2011. The matches were played on 20–21 December 2011.

Quarter-finals
The draw for this round took place on 21 December 2011. The matches were played on 7–8 February 2012.

All times CET

Semi-finals
The draw for this round took place on 11 February 2012. The matches were played on 20–21 March 2012.

All times CET

Final

Top goalscorers
Final statistics.

7 goals
 Robert Lewandowski (Borussia Dortmund)

5 goals
 Klaas-Jan Huntelaar (Schalke 04)

4 goals
 Adrián Ramos (Hertha BSC)
 Sercan Sararer (Greuther Fürth)

3 goals
 Cacau (VfB Stuttgart)
 Markus Feulner (1. FC Nürnberg)
 Daniel Frahn (RB Leipzig)
 Marco Reus (Borussia Mönchengladbach)
 Sascha Rösler (Fortuna Düsseldorf)
 Matthew Taylor (SC Paderborn)

References

External links
DFB-Pokal on kicker.de

2011-12
2011–12 in German football cups